Maria De Matteis (6 March 1898 – 9 December 1988) was an Italian costume designer. She was nominated at the 29th Academy Awards for Best Costumes-Color for the film War and Peace.

She worked on over 90 films from 1937 to 1985.

References

External links

1898 births
1988 deaths
Best Costume Design BAFTA Award winners
Italian costume designers
Film people from Florence